In mathematics, well-behaved topological spaces can be localized at primes, in a similar way to the localization of a ring at a prime.

The reason to do this was in line with an idea of making topology, more precisely algebraic topology, more geometric. Localization of a space X is a geometric form of the algebraic device of choosing 'coefficients' in order to simplify the algebra, in a given problem. Instead of that, the localization can be applied to the space X, directly, giving a second space Y.

Definitions
We let A be a subring of the rational numbers, and let X be a simply connected CW complex. Then there is a simply connected CW complex Y together with a map from X to Y such that
Y is A-local; this means that all its homology groups are modules over A
The map from X to Y is universal for (homotopy classes of) maps from X to A-local CW complexes.
This space Y is unique up to homotopy equivalence, and is called the localization
of X at A. 

If A is the localization of Z at a prime p, then the space Y is called the localization of X at p

The map from X to Y induces isomorphisms from the A-localizations of the homology and homotopy groups of X to the homology and homotopy groups of Y.

See also 
:Category:Localization (mathematics)
 Local analysis
 Localization of a category
 Localization of a module
 Localization of a ring
 Bousfield localization

References

Homotopy theory
Localization (mathematics)